Warren Field is the location of a mesolithic calendar monument built about 8,000 BCE. It includes 12 pits believed to correlate with phases of the Moon and used as a lunisolar calendar. It is considered to be the oldest lunisolar calendar yet found. It is near Crathes Castle, in the Aberdeenshire region of Scotland, in the United Kingdom.  It was originally discovered from the air as anomalous terrain by the Royal Commission on the Ancient and Historical Monuments of Scotland.  It was first excavated in 2004.

The pits align on the south east horizon and a prominent topographic point associated with sunrise on the midwinter solstice (thus providing an annual astronomical correction concerning the passage of time as indicated by the Moon, the asynchronous solar year and the associated seasons). The Aberdeenshire time reckoner predates the Mesopotamian calendars by nearly 5,000 years. It was also interpreted as a seasonal calendar because the local prehistoric communities, which relied on hunting migrating animals needed to carefully note the seasons to be prepared for a particular food source. The Warren Field site is particularly significant for its very early date and the fact that it was created by hunter-gatherer peoples, rather than sedentary farmers usually associated with monument building.

See also
 Prehistoric Scotland
 Prehistoric Britain
 Neolithic British Isles
 Göbekli Tepe
 Callanish Stones
 Stonehenge

References

Stone Age sites in Scotland
Archaeological sites in Aberdeenshire